Fargana Hoque (born 19 March 1993) is a Bangladeshi cricketer who plays for the Bangladesh cricket team as a right-handed batter.

Early life
Hoque was born in Gaibandha, Bangladesh.

Career
Hoque was a member of the team that won a silver medal in cricket against the China national women's cricket team at the 2010 Asian Games in Guangzhou, China.

Hoque made her ODI debut against Ireland on 26 November 2011. Hoque made her T20I debut against Ireland on 28 August 2012. In June 2018, she was part of Bangladesh's squad that won their first ever Women's Asia Cup title, winning the 2018 Women's Twenty20 Asia Cup tournament. Later the same month, she was named in Bangladesh's squad for the 2018 ICC Women's World Twenty20 Qualifier tournament.

In October 2018, she was named in Bangladesh's squad for the 2018 ICC Women's World Twenty20 tournament in the West Indies.

In August 2019, she was named in Bangladesh's squad for the 2019 ICC Women's World Twenty20 Qualifier tournament in Scotland. In November 2019, she was named in Bangladesh's squad for the cricket tournament at the 2019 South Asian Games. The Bangladesh team beat Sri Lanka by two runs in the final to win the gold medal.

In January 2020, she was named in Bangladesh's squad for the 2020 ICC Women's T20 World Cup in Australia. In November 2021, she was named in Bangladesh's team for the 2021 Women's Cricket World Cup Qualifier tournament in Zimbabwe. In January 2022, she was named in Bangladesh's team for the 2022 Commonwealth Games Cricket Qualifier tournament in Malaysia. Later the same month, she was named in Bangladesh's team for the 2022 Women's Cricket World Cup in New Zealand. On 25 March 2022, in Bangladesh's World Cup match against Australia, she became the first batter for Bangladesh Women to score 1,000 runs in WODIs.

References

External links
 
 

1993 births
Living people
People from Gaibandha District
Bangladeshi women cricketers
Bangladesh women One Day International cricketers
Bangladesh women Twenty20 International cricketers
Rajshahi Division women cricketers
Rangpur Division women cricketers
Barisal Division women cricketers
Southern Zone women cricketers
Cricketers at the 2010 Asian Games
Asian Games medalists in cricket
Cricketers at the 2014 Asian Games
Asian Games silver medalists for Bangladesh
Medalists at the 2010 Asian Games
Medalists at the 2014 Asian Games
South Asian Games gold medalists for Bangladesh
South Asian Games medalists in cricket